Christian Scheffler (born 29 March 1972) is a German handball player. He competed in the men's tournament at the 1996 Summer Olympics.

References

External links
 

1972 births
Living people
German male handball players
Olympic handball players of Germany
Handball players at the 1996 Summer Olympics
Sportspeople from Hamburg